Middlesbrough Borough Police, sometimes referred to as Middlesbrough Constabulary, was the police force of Middlesbrough, England, established in 1853. On 1 April 1968, the force was amalgamated into Teesside Constabulary, which itself became part of Cleveland Constabulary in 1974.

In 1934, the force had a strength of one Chief Constable, one Chief Inspector, six Inspectors, twenty Sergeants, 136 Constables, three Matrons, and eight civilian staff.

Chief constables
Henry Riches, 1902–1930
Donald Heald, 1932–?
Ralph Davison, 1957–1968

Footnotes

Defunct police forces of England
Middlesbrough
1853 establishments in England
Organizations established in 1853
Organizations disestablished in 1968